Robert Glen McCann (April 22, 1964 – July 1, 2011) was an American professional basketball player. He was listed as a power forward at 6'7" (or 6'6") and 244–248 lbs. McCann died of heart failure in July 2011.

McCann was born in Morristown, New Jersey. He attended Upsala College, a Division III school, for one academic year (1982–83) and then transferred to Division I Morehead State University, where he played for three seasons (from 1984 to 1987; after having dropped the 1983–84 season as a transfer student). He was selected with the 32nd overall pick in the 1987 NBA draft, and played in the NBA intermittently for five seasons (from 1989–90 until 1997–98) with five different teams (Dallas Mavericks, Detroit Pistons, Minnesota Timberwolves, Washington Bullets, and Toronto Raptors), averaging 4.2 points and 2.6 rebounds per game. He played as well in the USBL and CBA leagues in the country, and abroad in Spain, France, Puerto Rico, Turkey, and Argentina.

References

External links
NBA stats @ basketballreference.com
Minnesota Timberwolves profile

1964 births
2011 deaths
African-American basketball players
American expatriate basketball people in Argentina
American expatriate basketball people in Canada
American expatriate basketball people in France
American expatriate basketball people in Spain
American expatriate basketball people in Turkey
American men's basketball players
Basketball players from New Jersey
Besançon BCD players
Boca Juniors basketball players
Charleston Gunners players
Club Ourense Baloncesto players
Dallas Mavericks players
Detroit Pistons players
Liga ACB players
Milwaukee Bucks draft picks
Minnesota Timberwolves players
Morehead State Eagles men's basketball players
Morristown High School (Morristown, New Jersey) alumni
Olimpia Milano players
Pensacola Tornados (1986–1991) players
People from Morristown, New Jersey
Rapid City Thrillers players
Sioux Falls Skyforce (CBA) players
Small forwards
South Philadelphia High School alumni
Sportspeople from Morris County, New Jersey
Tenerife CB players
Toronto Raptors players
Upsala Vikings men's basketball players
Washington Bullets players
American expatriate basketball people in the Philippines
Magnolia Hotshots players
Philippine Basketball Association imports
TNT Tropang Giga players
20th-century African-American sportspeople
21st-century African-American people
Polluelos de Aibonito players